Pseudodellamora brevicollis is a beetle in the genus Pseudodellamora of the family Mordellidae. It was described in 1876 by Emery.

References

Mordellidae
Beetles described in 1876